The Secret of the Black Widow is a 1963 West German crime film directed by Franz Josef Gottlieb and starring O. W. Fischer, Karin Dor and Klaus Kinski. It is part of a boom of Krimi films produced during the decade, the third of four films based on the work of Louis Weinert-Wilton that came in the wake of Rialto Film's successful Edgar Wallace adaptations. It was shot in Spain. The film's sets were designed by the art director Ramiro Gómez.

Cast
 O. W. Fischer as Wellby
 Karin Dor as Clarisse
 Klaus Kinski as Boyd
 Werner Peters as Mr. Shor
 Doris Kirchner as Mrs. Shor
 Eddi Arent as Fish
 Claude Farell as Mrs. Ayke
 Gabriel Llopart as Selwood
 José María Caffarel as Cartwright
 Antonio Casas as Bronsfield
 Félix Dafauce as Inspector Terry
 Cris Huerta as Slim
 Tomás Blanco
 Ángel Menéndez
 George Rigaud

References

Bibliography
 Goble, Alan. The Complete Index to Literary Sources in Film. Walter de Gruyter, 1999.

External links

1963 films
1963 crime films
1960s German-language films
German crime films
West German films
German black-and-white films
Films directed by Franz Josef Gottlieb
Films based on Czech novels
Films set in London
1960s German films